The adverbial case (abbreviated ) is a noun case in Abkhaz and Georgian with a function similar to that of the translative and essive cases in Finnic languages. It is also featured in Udmurt.

The term is sometimes used to refer to the ablative case of other languages.

Examples
In Georgian, the adverbial case has several functions. Its most common usage is to derive adverbs from adjectives, like in English:

The adverbial case suffix is -ad.

The adverbial case can also act as the essive case:

The adverbial case also used in stating the name of a language:

With the passive future participle in sa-, the adverbial case often forms purposive or infinitival-like constructions:

References

Grammatical cases